An escape chute is a special kind of emergency exit, used where conventional fire escape stairways are impractical. The chute is a fabric (or occasionally metal) tube installed near a special exit on an upper floor or roof of a building, or a tall structure. During use, the chute is deployed, and may be secured at the bottom by a fire fighting crew some distance out from the building. Once the tube is ready, escapees enter the tube and slide down to a lower level or the ground level.

Description

Although some early escape tubes were made entirely of metal, most current designs are made of high-strength fabrics, such as Kevlar. Their flexibility allows for compact storage, rapid deployment, and a gentler braking and controlled descent of users, as compared to traditional metal designs. Fabric tubes may also incorporate inflatable elements to lend some degree of structural rigidity and stability to the escape chute. The fabrics chosen must have flame retardant properties as well.

In addition to fixed escape chutes permanently installed onto buildings, mobile escape systems are produced which can be mounted on the basket of a movable fire truck ladder, or temporarily installed to a building in an emergency.

In response to images of trapped office workers in the September 11 attacks, personal escape devices for emergency use have been proposed, but only rope-based systems appear to be on the market for personal use.

There was also the issue of fire heating the metal tubes, causing the people inside the metal tubes to become severely burned while exiting the building.

Escape chutes are also installed in air traffic control towers where space for redundant stairwells is limited. Escape chutes were tested at the control tower at Kadena Air Base.

History

In 1948, the 136-bed Georgia Baptist Hospital in Atlanta featured a large fabric escape chute that was claimed to be able to empty the hospital "in only a few minutes".

An escape chute system was installed at the Cape Canaveral launchpads for the now-discontinued NASA Space Shuttle, to allow personnel to rapidly reach a safety refuge blast shelter in the event of an imminent fire or explosion. The system was tested, but never deployed in actual use.

See also
 Evacuation slide

References

External links
 — Product brochure, including detailed technical diagram of deployed chute
 — review of basic concepts, no actual products shown

Safety equipment
Firefighting equipment
Architectural elements